Aries MotorSport is a British kit car manufacturer based in Cardiff South Wales. The company was created in April 2007 and is the distributor of the Stuart Taylor Locost and LocoBlade kits. These are Lotus Seven replicas based either in car or bike engines.

Besides supplying kit cars or parts, Aries MotorSport also sells factory built cars, converts car-engined cars into bike-engined cars and IVA work and presentation. The cars can be either right hand drive or left hand drive. There is both a live axle and an IRS version. The IRS version uses Ford Sierra shortened driveshafts, thus keeping the proportions from the original Locost.

There are several Stuart Taylor and Aries cars running on the British Locost championship, with wins in 5 out of 6 years between 2000 and 2006. There are at least 5 currently running in the 2016 Locost series.

Since 2015 Aries Motorsport are also home to the Sabre G2, a mid/rear engined space framed open two seat sports car. It is eligible for many championship series and in 2016 will be running in the 750mc RGB championship for bike engined cars. It runs the ultra reliable Honda CBR1000R Fireblade engine, and with an all up weight of around 435 kg gives a power-to-weight ratio of over 400 bhp per tonne.

External links

References

Kit car manufacturers
Car manufacturers of the United Kingdom
Lotus Seven replicas